American actress and singer Alyssa Milano has released: four studio albums, one reissue, two compilation albums, two video albums, five music videos and thirteen singles (including three charity singles). Milano debuted as an actress in the television sitcom Who's the Boss?, which premiered in September 1984. While acting, she signed a five-album deal with Japanese record label Pony Canyon, Inc. Prior to her record contract, Milano had contributed to the charity single "We Are The World" as part of a group of child stars. She also released an exercise video, entitled Alyssa Milano's Teen Steam, and recorded its theme song along with a rap.

Milano's debut studio album Look in My Heart was released in March 1989, peaking at number 68 on the Japanese Oricon Albums Chart. It produced the singles "Look in My Heart", "What a Feeling", and "Straight to the Top", as well as a video album of the same name. Milano's second and eponymous studio album was released later that year, and peaked at number 15 on the Oricon Albums Chart and was certified platinum by the Recording Industry Association of Japan (RIAJ). To promote the album, "I Had a Dream" and "Happiness" were made available for purchase as its singles. In 1990, the singer released her first compilation album, The Best in the World: Non-Stop Special Remix/Alyssa's Singles, which spent a total of eight weeks on the Oricon Albums Chart where it reached its highest position at number nine. The single "The Best in the World" peaked at number 85 on the Oricon Singles Chart, marking her only appearance on that chart.

In May 1990, Milano released the non-album single "I Love When We're Together", which was followed by the singer's third studio album Locked Inside a Dream in May 1991. It peaked at number 19 on the Oricon Albums Chart, remaining on it for a total of five weeks. It spawned the single "New Sensation". In that same year, Milano also contributed to the charity single "Voices That Care" as one of the choir members. The song peaked at number eleven on the Billboard Hot 100, and at number six on the Billboard Adult Contemporary chart. In addition it was certified platinum by the Recording Industry Association of America (RIAA). Her fourth studio album Do You See Me? was released in September 1992, and charted at number 47 on the Oricon Albums Chart. In 1993, Locked Inside a Dream was reissued exclusively in France with the title Alyssa Milano and was promoted there through the release of the single "No Secret". Milano's final record was her second compilation album, The Very Best of Alyssa Milano, released in January 1995.

Albums

Studio albums

Reissues

Compilation albums

Singles

As lead artist

Footnotes:
 1 Only released as a single in France

Charity singles

Videography

Video albums

Music videos

References

Citations

Bibliography

External links
 Alyssa Milano discography at MTV.com
 [ Alyssa Milano discography at Allmusic]

Discography
Discographies of American artists
Pop music discographies